Van Rooy or Van Rooij is a Dutch toponymic surname. "Rooij" was a local term for many towns ending with "rode" or "roij", like Nistelrode, Sint-Oedenrode, Stramproy and Wanroij. This suffix means "a clearing made by men".

Colonialisation caused an expansion of Europe into the rest of the world. South Africa saw many European/Dutch Settlers from the late 16 century to the 18th century. Along with the complex socio-geodemographic development that occurred in South Africa at the time, the van Rooy family name expanded in 2 directions within the racial context of the time. Attached (and to come) is the family tree of Pieter & Johanna van Rooy (maiden surname: Koordom) whom originated from Piketberg (RSA) and moved (circa 1920) to Cape Town (RSA). They reared 8 children from whom the family has evolved into its current 5th generation.

Notable people with this surname include:

Anton van Rooy (1870–1932), Dutch bass-baritone opera singer
Bart van Rooij (born 2001), Dutch footballer
Charles van Rooy (1912–1996), Dutch politician
Elsbeth van Rooy-Vink (born 1973), Dutch mountain biker
Frans van Rooij (born 1963), Dutch footballer
Kenneth Van Rooy (born 1993), Belgian racing cyclist
Yvonne van Rooy (born 1951), Dutch politician, daughter of Charles

See also
Van Rooy sheep, a breed of sheep named after the original breeder, South African Senator J. C. van Rooy
Van Rooi, variant spelling
Van Rooyen and Van Royen, Dutch surnames of the same origin

References

Dutch-language surnames
Surnames of Dutch origin
Toponymic surnames